Magician's Gambit is the third part of The Belgariad, a fantasy book series written by David Eddings continuing the events in Queen of Sorcery and is followed by Castle of Wizardry.

Plot summary
Garion and friends go after Ctuchik, the evil Angarak sorcerer who has the Orb.

Reception
Colin Greenland reviewed Magician's Gambit for Imagine magazine, and stated that "For all its accumulated bulk of pages, this really is easy reading. Try it to distract you while you're weaving your next tapestry."

Reviews
Review by Joseph Nicholas (1984) in Paperback Inferno, Volume 7, Number 6
Review [French] by Olivier Coron (1991) in Yellow Submarine, #85

References

American fantasy novels
Novels by David Eddings